Pneumatic hammer may refer to:

Air hammer (fabrication), a pneumatic hand tool
Jackhammer, a pneumatically driven tool used to break up rock and pavement
Nail gun, a pneumatically powered tool used to set nails
Pneumatic hammer (forging), a pneumatically driven forging hammer
Rivet gun, a pneumatically powered tool used to set rivets

See also
Air hammer (disambiguation)